Stokely is a given name and a surname. Notable people with the name include:

Given name
 Stokely Carmichael (1941–1998), American civil rights activist

Surname
Samuel Stokely (1796–1861), U.S. Representative from Ohio
Scott Stokely (born 1969), American disc golfer
Tim Stokely (born 1983), British businessman, founder and CEO of OnlyFans

See also
 Stokely vegetables, a canned food brand currently owned by Seneca Foods
 Stokley (disambiguation)
 Stokeley, a 2018 album by Ski Mask the Slump God